Charlebois is an unincorporated area and railway point in Census division 23 in Northern Manitoba, Canada, located  north northeast of the Limestone Generating Station (on the Nelson River).

History
Charlebois was founded with the building of the Hudson Bay Railway in the third decade of the 20th century. When the originally intended final section line route north east to Port Nelson was abandoned, the construction of the new route of the final section from Amery ( to the south) north to Churchill, which opened in 1929, led to its founding. Charlebois lies on the line between the settlements of Amery to the south and Weir River to the north.

Transportation
Charlebois is the site of Charlebois railway station, served by the Via Rail Winnipeg–Churchill train.

References

Unincorporated communities in Northern Region, Manitoba